San Marino is a hamlet and a ferry port near Lopar, Croatia on the island of Rab.
The port (Trajektna luka San Marino) connects to Goli otok.

References

Populated places in Primorje-Gorski Kotar County
Rab